Irakli Heorhiyevych Meskhia (born 7 January 1993) is a professional Georgian-born Ukrainian football midfielder.

Meskhia is a product of youth team systems of Obolon Kyiv.

Made his debut for Obolon entering as a substituted player in game against Metalurh Donetsk on 24 March 2012 in Ukrainian Premier League.

In January 2013 he signed half-year on loan deal with the Ukrainian Premier League club FC Hoverla, but not played for this team.

On 17 July 2018, he signed a contract with Motor Lublin. On 20 December 2018, his contract was terminated by mutual agreement.

References

External links

1993 births
Living people
People from Gali (town)
Association football midfielders
Ukrainian footballers
Ukrainian people of Georgian descent
FC Obolon-Brovar Kyiv players
FC Hoverla Uzhhorod players
OKS Stomil Olsztyn players
Chojniczanka Chojnice players
Ukrainian Premier League players
Ukrainian expatriate footballers
Expatriate footballers in Poland
Ukrainian expatriate sportspeople in Poland
Wisła Puławy players